Kofoed is a Danish surname. It can also be spelled Kofod, Koefod, or Koefoed.

People
Alexandra Koefoed, Norwegian sailor
Bart Kofoed, American former professional basketball player
Carl Andreas Koefoed, Danish agronomist
Charlotte Koefoed, Danish rower
Einar Laurentius Koefoed, Norwegian marine scientist
Erik Kofoed-Hansen, Danish fencer
Flemming Kofod-Svendsen, Danish minister and politician
Hans Jespersen Koefoed, Danish painter
Holger Koefoed, Norwegian art historian
Jens Christian Kofoed, Danish architect
Jens Pedersen Koefoed, Danish officer, known as "the liberator of Bornholm"
Jeppe Kofod, Danish politician
Kristian Hansen Kofoed, Danish civil servant and politician 
Kylie Kofoed, Miss Idaho 2010
Peder Kofod Ancher, Danish jurist
Peter Koefoed, Danish field hockey player
, Danish politician
Rasmus Kofoed, Danish chef
Rasmus Kofoed, Danish cricketer
Rigmor Kofoed-Larsen, Norwegian politician
Seana Kofoed,  American television and stage actress
Sofia Anker-Kofoed, Swedish footballer
, Danish actor

Other
Kofoeds School, a social pedagogical school in Copenhagen, Denmark